Neil George Carmichael, Baron Carmichael of Kelvingrove (10 October 1921 – 19 July 2001) was a Scottish politician. He was a Labour Member of Parliament (MP) in Glasgow from 1962 to 1983.

Early life
Carmichael was the son of James Carmichael MP and the grandson of George Carmichael, a founder member of the Independent Labour Party (ILP). He was educated at Eastbank Academy, in Shettleston, and the Royal College of Science and Technology, Glasgow. In the Second World War he was a conscientious objector. He was an engineer and a councillor on Glasgow Town Council.

Parliamentary career
Carmichael was elected as MP for Glasgow Woodside at a by-election in November 1962 (maiden speech 17 December 1962 (669 c930-4)), and held the seat until the constituency was abolished at the February 1974 election, when he was elected for Glasgow Kelvingrove. He served in Harold Wilson's governments in various positions including Parliamentary Secretary for Transport, Parliamentary Secretary for Technology and later Under Secretary for Environment.

In 1980 he introduced a private member's bill to make seatbelts compulsory, but it was "talked out" during the report stage

For the 1983 general election his constituency was abolished and merged with Glasgow Hillhead which had been won in a by-election by  the former Labour Deputy Leader Roy Jenkins for the SDP. The two incumbent MPs fought each other, with Jenkins, now the SDP's leader, winning by 1,164 votes.

Ministerial posts 
He held the following ministerial posts during his time in the House of Commons:

 Parliamentary Secretary, Ministry of Transport (1967–1969)
 Parliamentary Secretary, Ministry of Technology (1969–1970)
 Parliamentary Under-Secretary, Department of the Environment (1974–1975)
 Parliamentary Under-Secretary, Department of Industry (1975–1976)

House of Lords
Carmichael was created a Life peer as Baron Carmichael of Kelvingrove, of Camlachie in the District of the City of Glasgow on 10 October 1983. During his time in the House of Lords he became Labour's spokesman on transport and Scotland.

Death 
Carmichael died following a stroke after a long illness, according to Lord Graham of Edmonton.

Personal life
He was married to Kay Carmichael, a Scottish political activist; from 1948 until they divorced in 1987. Together they had one daughter.

References

External links 
 
Guardian obituary
Telegraph obituary
BBC News Article - Ex-Labour Minister Carmichael dies
Neil Carmichael MP on www.theyworkforyou.com

1921 births
2001 deaths
British conscientious objectors
GMB (trade union)-sponsored MPs
Members of the Parliament of the United Kingdom for Glasgow constituencies
Scottish Labour MPs
Carmichael of Kelvingrove 
Councillors in Glasgow
UK MPs 1959–1964
UK MPs 1964–1966
UK MPs 1966–1970
UK MPs 1970–1974
UK MPs 1974
UK MPs 1974–1979
UK MPs 1979–1983
People educated at Eastbank Academy
Ministers in the Wilson governments, 1964–1970
Alumni of the Royal College of Science and Technology
Life peers created by Elizabeth II